Live at Newport '58 is a live album by jazz pianist Horace Silver.  The album was recorded on July 6, 1958 at the Newport Jazz Festival.  Blue Note Records released the album in 2008. It is one of the few officially released live albums with Silver as bandleader.

Producer Michael Cuscuna discovered Silver's Newport performance while auditioning tapes at the Library of Congress.  He was able to locate a three-track master recording in Columbia Records' archives, as Columbia producer George Avakian had supervised the recording of the entire 1958 Newport Festival.

Performance and reception
The personnel lineup that appears on this album was relatively short-lived.  Junior Cook and Louis Hayes were the only two sidemen remaining from the previous edition of the Quintet.  Trumpeter Louis Smith, who replaced Donald Byrd, was with the group for only a short time before Blue Mitchell replaced him, and this album presents Smith's only full performance with the group. However, critic Jeff Tamarkin writes that "[Smith's] playing on this date is monstrous", and The Penguin Guide to Jazz notes that "any thought that Smith was a stop-gap is blown away at once." On the final track, "'Senor Blues', he pushes the leader into one of his best, and most forceful, recorded solos

The Penguin Guide to Jazz noted that "a lot of archive rediscoveries are just ticks in collectors' boxes.  This one has real musical value and high excitement: iconic hard bop."

Track listing

Personnel 

 Louis Smith – trumpet
 Junior Cook – tenor saxophone
 Horace Silver – piano
 Gene Taylor – bass
 Louis Hayes – drums

References 

Horace Silver albums
Live hard bop albums
Albums recorded at the Newport Jazz Festival
Blue Note Records live albums
Albums produced by Michael Cuscuna
1958 in Rhode Island